Bowling Green is an unincorporated community and census-designated place (CDP) in Allegany County, Maryland, United States. As of the 2010 census it had a population of 1,077.

It is located along U.S. Route 220 (McMullen Highway), directly southwest of the city of Cumberland and includes the former community of Roberts. The CDP of Potomac Park borders Bowling Green to the south, the Potomac River is to the east and Haystack Mountain is to the west. For many years, the community was mostly farmland but was later divided into building lots by the Buchanan, Roberts and Long families. CSX Transportation railroad tracks skirt the community along the river; in earlier years, a predecessor maintained the Roberts train station, which has since been closed.

The Upper Potomac Industrial Park is located in the northern part of the community, close to Cumberland.

Demographics

References

External links
 Bowling Green Volunteer Fire Department

Census-designated places in Allegany County, Maryland
Populated places in the Cumberland, MD-WV MSA
Census-designated places in Maryland
Cumberland, MD-WV MSA
Populated places on the North Branch Potomac River